"Crazy Heart" is a song by Hank Williams.  It was written by Fred Rose and Maurice Murray and reached number four in the record chart for Williams in 1951.  It was recorded at Castle Studio in Nashville on July 25, 1951 with Fred Rose producing and backing from Don Helms (steel guitar), Jerry Rivers (fiddle), Sammy Pruett (lead guitar), Howard Watts (bass) and probably Jack Shook (rhythm guitar).

It was one of Williams least commercially successful singles of the period, only spending two weeks on the chart, although Guy Lombardo dented the Top 20 with it, underscoring that the song was better suited to a palm court orchestra than Hank Williams.

Cover versions
Jerry Lee Lewis cut several takes of the song for Sun Records in 1958.
Ernest Tubb released the song on Decca Records.
Hank Williams, Jr. recorded the song as an overdubbed duet on MGM in 1965.
Don Gibson covered the song in 1971 on Hickory Records.
Stonewall Jackson recorded the song in 1971.

References

1951 songs
Songs written by Fred Rose (songwriter)
Hank Williams songs
Song recordings produced by Fred Rose (songwriter)